is a Japanese football player for Sydney United 58.

Career

YSCC Yokohama
After being raised from the YSCC Yokohama youth ranks, Kaneko was promoted to the top team in March 2017. He had the chance of debuting in the J3 League only one year after he was signed: Kaneko came in against Giravanz Kitakyushu in a game of July 2018.

Taichung Futuro
In August 2019, Kaneko joined the Taiwanese team Taichung Futuro F.C. on a short-term loan.

Sydney United
On 27 February 2022, Kaneko joined the NPL NSW Australian team Sydney United 58. He made his senior debut on 26 June in a 3-3 league draw against Rockdale Ilinden. He scored his first senior goal for the club against APIA Leichhardt in the last game of the season.

Club statistics
Updated to 23 August 2018.

References

External links

Profile at J. League
Profile at YSCC Yokohama

1998 births
Living people
Association football people from Kanagawa Prefecture
Japanese footballers
J3 League players
YSCC Yokohama players
Association football defenders
Sydney United 58 FC players